Braço do Norte is a municipality in the state of Santa Catarina in the South region of Brazil. Most known for its agriculture and square fabrics, it was colonized by mostly German immigrants in the Second World War, such as Polish and Italians.

See also
List of municipalities in Santa Catarina

References

External links
 

Municipalities in Santa Catarina (state)